DeJarnette is a surname. Notable people with the surname include:

Daniel Coleman DeJarnette Sr. (1822–1881), prominent Virginia politician
David L. DeJarnette (1907–1991), archaeologist
Edmund DeJarnette (1897–1966), Member of the Virginia House of Delegates
Edmund DeJarnette (1938–2015), ambassador
Evelyn Magruder DeJarnette (1842–1914), American author
Joseph DeJarnette (1866–1957), the director of Western State Hospital (located in Staunton, Virginia) from 1905 to 1943
Layron DeJarnette (fl. 2000s–2010s), illustrator

See also
DeJarnette's Tavern, nationally registered historic place near Nathalie, Halifax County, Virginia, USA
DeJarnette, Virginia, unincorporated community in Caroline County, in the U.S. state of Virginia